The O'Cahan (Irish: Ó Catháin 'descendants of Cahan') were a powerful sept of the Northern Uí Néill’s Cenél nEógain in medieval Ireland. The name is presently anglicized as Keane, O'Kane and Kane.

The O'Cahan's originated in Laggan in the east of County Donegal and from there moved eastwards in the twelfth century, ousting the O'Connor from Keenaght in County Londonderry. They held the lordship of Keenaght and Coleraine until the seventeenth century, to which it was commonly referred to as "O'Cahan's country". Under the sub-ordination of their kin, the O'Neills, they held the privilege of inaugurating the chief of the O'Neill by tossing a shoe over the new chief's head in acceptance of his rule.

There is also an unrelated sept of O'Cahan in the province of Connacht, the O'Cahan Ui Fiachra (Ó Catháin Uí Fiachrach). At first O'Cahan held the title chief of Cenel Ianna. After expelling O'Drennan (Ó Draighneán), chief of Cenel Sedna, O'Cahan was henceforth known as chief of Cenel Sedna. Eoghan O'Cahan (Eogháin Ua Catháin), abbot of Clonfert (Cluan-fearta-Brennainn), County Galway, Republic of Ireland, died 980 A.D. He was the earliest recorded O'Cahan and most likely belonged to the O'Cahans of Galway.

Name
The surname has been anglicised O'Cahan, Cahan, McCaughan, O'Kane, Kane, O'Keane, Keane, O'Kean, O'Keene, Keen, Keene, Kain, O'Kaine, Kathan, and similar variations thereof.

History

The O'Cahan sept of Keenaght Glengiven first appear on record in 1138. A thirteenth-century chief of the family was Cumee na Gall O'Cahan. A heavily restored effigy at Dungiven Priory is sometimes associated with Cumee, although it appears to date to the last quarter of the fifteenth century, and seems to be that of a later member of the sept. Dunseverick Castle also formed part of the O'Cahan possessions until their destruction by the English.

The clan suffered a blow during the battle of Drumderg, where fifteen O'Cahan chieftains were slain in battle against the Normans and their gaelic allies.

Rory Dall O'Cahan, an Irish harpist of the 17th century most famous as the composer of Give Me Your Hand, may have penned the popular Irish tune the "Londonderry Air", in order to lament the destruction of O'Cahan power. Consequently, it may have been originally called "O'Cahan's Lament". The music is best known as the tune of the song "Danny Boy".

By the late 16th-century, "O'Cahan's Country" became the county of Coleraine. The majority of Ó Catháin chiefs fled Ulster in the Flight of the Earls in 1607, and under the terms of Surrender and regrant they forfeited their lands to the English crown. During the subsequent Plantation of Ulster, County Coleraine along with parts of counties Antrim, Donegal, and Tyrone, were merged to form County Londonderry. After the Flight of the Earls in 1607, Donnell Ballagh O'Cahan, Chief of the Ó Catháin (and at one time knighted by the English Crown), was captured and sent to the Tower of London, where he died in 1626. There has been no Chief since.

See also
Manus O'Cahan's Regiment
Clan Buchanan
Clan Munro

External links
Ó Catháin in Ireland

References

History of Northern Ireland
Irish families
Surnames of Irish origin
O Cathain